Chiren, also spelled Chyren and named as Selin and Seline, is a person who appears in the predictions of Nostradamus. Chiren would be a European, presumably from France. The arrival of this person would coincide with a great war bringing several decades of suffering and several decades of peace. A man with a black frizzy beard would be an enemy of Chiren. According to Nostradamus, Chiren would eventually reign as a world leader and ensure long-lasting world peace.

Predictions 
The names Chiren, Chyren, Selin and Seline are mentioned several times in Nostradamus' work Les Prophéties. The table below shows the cryptic verses in which the names appear. The translations are based on various interpretations of the original texts.

Literature 
 Nostradamus. (2007). The Complete Prophecies of Nostradamus. Wilder Publications. .
 Nostradamus, M., & Allgeier, K. (1994). De complete verzen van Nostradamus: De originele teksten, vertaling en toelichting op de voorspellingen (in Dutch). Elmar. .

References 

Nostradamus
Prophecy